King of Sorrow is a 2007 Canadian television film starring Kim Coates and Lara Daans; it was written, produced, and directed by Damian Lee. A psychological thriller and love story, it features the final filmed performance by Chris Penn.

Plot
A homicidal, drug-addicted policeman who suffered an abusive childhood develops a relationship with a suicidal psychiatrist.

Cast
 Kim Coates as Steve Serrano
Lara Daans as Dani Brookes
Angela Asher as Dr. Dreyfus
Daniel Matmor as Frank Jennings
Stefano Pezzetta as Young Steve
Robert Van Dyke as Steve's Uncle
Nicole Robert as Old Prostitute
 Robert Norman Smith as John Baker
 Stephanie Moore as Julia Baker
Sadie LeBlanc as Blondie
Heidi von Palleske as Dr. Sally Champlain
Chris Penn as Detective Enola

External links
 

2007 television films
2007 films
2007 thriller films
Films directed by Damian Lee
Canadian thriller television films
Canadian thriller films
English-language Canadian films
Films produced by Damian Lee
Films about police officers
Films with screenplays by Damian Lee
2000s Canadian films